Frías Castle is the castle of the Dukes of Frías, located in Frías (Burgos province), overlooking the Tobalina valley.  It was built between the 12th and 15th century.

Gallery

Sources
The information in this article is based on that in its Spanish equivalent.
 Castillos de Burgos. Javier Remón Bernard. Ediciones Lancia. Madrid, 1993.

External links
 https://archive.today/20130213083255/http://www.ciudaddefrias.es/turismo-y-ocio/monumentos/castillo-de-frias

Castles in Castile and León

es:Frías (Burgos)